In the Name of the Law (or In nome della legge) is a 1949 Italian language mafia drama film directed by Pietro Germi. It Is based on Giuseppe Guido Lo Schiavo's   novel Piccola pretura.  Federico Fellini co-wrote the script. The style of the film is close to Italian neorealism film movement.

Cast
Massimo Girotti – Il pretore Guido Schiavi
Jone Salinas  – La baronessa Teresa Lo Vasto
Camillo Mastrocinque – Il barone Lo Vasto
Charles Vanel – Massaro Turi Passalacqua
Saro Urzì – Il maresciallo Grifò
Turi Pandolfini – Don Fifì
Umberto Spadaro – L'avvocato Faraglia
Saro Arcidiacono - Il cancelliere
Ignazio Balsamo – Francesco Messana
Nanda De Santis – Lorenzina La Scaniota
Bernardo Indelicato: Paolino
Nadia Niver – Bastianedda
Aldo Sguazzini	
Alfio Macrì – Il sindaco Leopoldo Pappalardo
Carmelo Olivero – Don Peppino

Awards
The film won 3  Nastro d'Argento: Best Actor (Massimo Girotti), Best Supporting Actor (Saro Urzì) and a special award for Pietro Germi.

External links

1949 films
Films about the Sicilian Mafia
1940s Italian-language films
Italian black-and-white films
Films about lawyers
Films directed by Pietro Germi
Films scored by Carlo Rustichelli
1949 crime drama films
Lux Film films
Italian crime drama films
1940s Italian films